Flatonia is a town in southwestern Fayette County, Texas, United States.

History
Established on April 8, 1874 on land that the Galveston, Harrisburg and San Antonio Railway acquired from William Alexander Faries (the family name is also spelled "Ferris" and "Farris"), the community was named after F. W. Flato, a local merchant and one of the first settlers, of whom most were Anglo American. The post office, established in the former Flatonia in 1870, moved to the new Flatonia with the same name. Flatonia was incorporated on November 10, 1875, and held its first election on December 6 of that year. In 1878, the town had 800 residents and an economy dependent on cattle and cotton.

The location of the railway and inexpensive real estate led to the arrival of Arab, Bohemian, German, Greek, and Italian immigrants in several waves. The north-south line of the Waco branch of the San Antonio and Aransas Pass Railway opened in the mid-1880s, leading to new settlements of Muldoon and Moulton. Competition from the settlements, respectively north and south of Flatonia, and an agricultural depression damaged Flatonia's economy. By 1900, Flatonia had a significant population decrease.

During the first half of the 20th century Flatonia's prospects increased and decreased according to the national economy and cattle and cotton markets. In 1950 Flatonia had 1,024 residents, 50 businesses, and a wide farm and ranch service area. In the 1960s, cotton no longer was a substantial aspect of the area economy; therefore many area farms began to ranch cattle. During that time the population was between 1,000 and 1,500. Interstate 10 (I-10) opened in the 1970s, leading many tourist businesses to move from U.S. Highway 90 to I-10, one mile north of Highway 90. In 1985, Flatonia had 69 businesses. In 1990, Flatonia had 1,295 residents.

Geography
Flatonia is located in southwestern Fayette County at  (29.686981, −97.107728). U.S. Route 90 passes through the center of town as Main Street, leading east  to Schulenburg and west 12 miles to Waelder. Texas State Highway 95 intersects US 90 in the center of Flatonia, entering from the south as Faires Street and from the north as Penn Street. Highway 95 leads south  to Shiner and north  to Smithville. Interstate 10 passes through the northern side of Flatonia, with access from Exit 661 (Highway 95). I-10 leads east  to Houston and west  to San Antonio.

Climate
Flatonia has hot, dry summers and mild, wet winters. Summers range in the 90s with a few days in July and August reaching 100. Winters can be chilly but rarely reach below freezing; low winter temperatures are mostly in the fifties or forties. Snow is rare.

Demographics

As of the 2020 United States census, there were 1,308 people, 496 households, and 412 families residing in the town.

As of the census of 2000, there were 1,377 people, 504 households, and 347 families residing in the town. The population density was 850.8 people per square mile (328.2/km2). There were 568 housing units at an average density of 350.9 per square mile (135.4/km2). The racial makeup of the town was 74.07% White, 7.48% African American, 0.94% Native American, 16.85% from other races, and 0.65% from two or more races. Hispanic or Latino of any race were 36.17% of the population.

There were 504 households, out of which 33.3% had children under the age of 18 living with them, 52.4% were married couples living together, 11.9% had a female householder with no husband present, and 31.0% were non-families. 27.4% of all households were made up of individuals, and 15.1% had someone living alone who was 65 years of age or older. The average household size was 2.62 and the average family size was 3.21.

In the town, the population was spread out, with 26.9% under the age of 18, 8.2% from 18 to 24, 25.4% from 25 to 44, 20.5% from 45 to 64, and 19.0% who were 65 years of age or older. The median age was 38 years. For every 100 females, there were 98.4 males. For every 100 females age 18 and over, there were 91.8 males.

The median income for a household in the town was $27,000, and the median income for a family was $31,471. Males had a median income of $23,700 versus $16,429 for females. The per capita income for the town was $12,329. About 18.9% of families and 23.4% of the population were below the poverty line, including 33.4% of those under age 18 and 27.4% of those age 65 or over.

Arts and culture

Annual cultural events
Many residents of Flatonia are of Czech, Slovak, German, or other Central European heritage. The local "Czhilispiel" festival is named for Czech people and their popular chili.

Museums and other points of interest
The abandoned Flatonia Railroad Tower, in use from 1902 to 1996, was one of Texas' longest standing, manually-operated railroad switching towers with north-south and east-west cross rails. The tower was damaged in an automobile accident on January 9, 2014.

The E. A. Arnim Archives and Museum has a collection of antique furniture, household items, clothing and historical documents used by the early settlers of Flatonia. There is a livery stable behind the museum with wagons, buggies, and vintage tack and farm implements.

Education
The town is served by the Flatonia Independent School District. Campuses include the Flatonia Elementary School and Flatonia Secondary School.

Photo gallery

References

External links
 
 City of Flatonia official website
 Chamber of Commerce
 
 Czhilispiel Festival
 The Flatonia Argus, local newspaper
 Flatonia in 1881
 Flatonia Independent School District
 City-Data.com
 ePodunk: Profile for Flatonia, Texas 

Czech-American culture in Texas
Towns in Fayette County, Texas
Towns in Texas